H is a French sitcom with seventy-one 22-minute episodes. The series was created by Abd-el-Kader Aoun, Xavier Matthew and Éric Judor, and produced by Phillippe Berthe, Édouard Molinaro, Jean-Luc Moreau and Charles Némès. It ran from 24 October 1998 to 20 April 2002 on Canal+. In Canada, it is shown weekly on TV5.

The title "H" comes from the three words that characterize the series: Humour, Histoire et Hôpital (Humour, Story and Hospital).

Premise 
The lives of the carelessly incompetent medical team at a hospital in the Parisian suburbs explode in surreal humour as they go about their daily duties.

Cast 

 Jamel Debbouze as Jamel Driddi
 Éric Judor as Aymé Cesaire
 Ramzy Bedia as Sabri Saïd
 Catherine Benguigui as Béatrice "Béa" Goldberg (seasons 1 and 2)
 Sophie Mounicot as Clara Saulnier
 Jean-Luc Bideau as Professor Maximilien « Max » Strauss
 Linda Hardy as Charlotte, Professor Strauss' daughter (season 3)
 Edgar Givry as the Director of the hospital

Guest appearances
In four seasons, many notable French actors appeared in guest starring roles or cameos.

Marie-Christine Adam as Philippe's Mother
Bernard Blancan as The Guide Michelin Inspector
Richard Bohringer as St. Peter
Anne Charrier as Jessica
Thomas Chabrol as The sales representative
Gerard Darmon as the police chief
Mouss Diouf as a thief
Gustave Kervern as Clément Dufresne
Lorànt Deutsch as a young intern
Jean-Claude Dreyfus as Cyril Strauss
Claire Nadeau as Eliane Strauss
Guilaine Londez as Emilie
Augustin Legrand as a skinhead
Serge Riaboukine as The Godfather
Joey Starr as the devil
Jean-Paul Rouve as The steward
Élise Tielrooy as The psychologist
Vincent Desagnat as A caregiver
Danièle Évenou as The inspector
Frédéric Bouraly 
Thierry Henry 
Philippe Khorsand
Urbain Cancelier
Pierre Palmade 
Patrick Poivre d'Arvor 
Micheline Presle 
Christine Ockrent 
Jean Dell
Richard Gotainer

Characters 

Djamel Driddi -  Switchboard operator in Orthopedics. He is ready to do anything to earn money and willing to place himself in difficult situations: cross-dressing, selling rats, trafficking expired  pizzas in the hospital, disguising himself as Santa Claus, etc. He is a pathological liar and often uses the expression "dis-moi pas que c’est pas vrai" (Don't tell me that it's not true!)
Aymé Césaire - a male nurse. He is the son of an Austrian woman (who ends up having an affair with Sabri) and a man from Guadeloupe. He is a cowardly hypochondriac, often cynical and arrogant. He is obsessed with women and suffers from hyper-sexuality. He claims to be fluent in "Ebonics" but is instead fluent in German. He is named after the Martiniquais poet, Aimé Césaire.
Sabri Saïd - a stretcher-bearer and later a barman at the bar "Barbylone" near the hospital. Although a comic character, he can be a "bad guy" : he poisons Aymé, Clara, and Professor Strauss, and locks Jamel out on his balcony.
Clara Saulnier - the chief nurse in Orthopedics. An older woman, she is domineering and persistent. Before becoming a nurse, she was an alcoholic prostitute and porn star. She shares a love-hate relationship with Aymé.
Beatrice "Béa" Goldberg - a doctor. She is a nice but unattractive young woman. She can also be considered the most "normal" of the characters. Unlucky in love, she finally falls for Jean-François Nguyen, a French-Vietnamese lawyer, but their wedding is broken up on the day of the marriage.
Professor Maximilien "Max" Strauss - Head surgeon. He is obsessed with sports, collectibles, money, and various sexual fetishes. Because of his incompetence, he is the defendant in several malpractice suits. He is unable to manage his group (who spend most of the day goofing off) and cannot remember their names correctly. He has a daughter named Charlotte, and the show hints that he may be the son of Hitler.
Edgar - the hospital administrator. Intelligent and ambitious, his plans are always thwarted by Professor Strauss, Aymé, or Sabri.

List of episodes

Distribution
A DVD featuring the "Best of H" as well as a box set featuring all four seasons have been released. The full series is also streamable on Netflix.

External links 

1998 French television series debuts
2002 French television series endings
French television sitcoms
Television shows set in France
Television shows set in Paris
Canal+ original programming